Joe O'Brien (born November 6, 1972) was an American Football lineman who played in the WLAF, AFL, and the NFL from 1995 to 1998. He later went on to coach at the collegiate level.

College career
O'Brien played college football at Boise State University in Idaho from 1991 to 1994. He lettered in his final two years and in 1994 was named Big Sky Conference defensive player of the year.

Professional career
Joe O'Brien was signed to a two-year contract as an undrafted rookie free agent by the Minnesota Vikings after the 1995 NFL draft but was cut before the 1995 regular season began. He was then signed by the San Jose Sabercats of the Arena Football League in 1996. He played only 2 games for San Jose before being chosen in the 19th round of the World League of American Football draft by the Scottish Claymores, where he played 10 games, starting 6 of them. The Claymores defeated the Frankfort Galaxy on June 23, 1996, to become the 1996 World Bowl champions. The following year, he was signed as a free agent by the New Orleans Saints during the offseason but again was cut before the 1997 regular season began. In 1998, he returned to the AFL and the San Jose Sabrecats, playing 11 games on both the offensive and defensive lines.

External links 
Former Boise State star, Montana State coach shares story of addiction. Farcountry Press.

References

1972 births
Living people
People from Pittsburg, California